Nefeli Papadakis (born October 2, 1998) is an American judoka. In 2020, she won the silver medal in the women's 78 kg event at the 2020 Pan American Judo Championships held in Guadalajara, Mexico. She also won a bronze medal in this event, both in 2019 and in 2021.

In 2019, she competed in the women's 78 kg event at the 2019 Pan American Games held in Lima, Peru. In that same year, she also competed in the women's 78 kg event at the 2019 World Judo Championships held in Tokyo, Japan.

In 2021, she competed in the women's 78 kg event at the 2021 Judo World Masters held in Doha, Qatar. She competed in the women's 78 kg event at the 2020 Summer Olympics in Tokyo, Japan. She was eliminated in her first match by Yoon Hyun-ji of South Korea.

Achievements

References

External links 
 

Living people
1998 births
Place of birth missing (living people)
American female judoka
Judoka at the 2019 Pan American Games
Pan American Games competitors for the United States
Judoka at the 2020 Summer Olympics
Olympic judoka of the United States
21st-century American women